Drakes Bay (Coast Miwok: Tamál-Húye) is a  wide bay named so by U.S. surveyor George Davidson in 1875 along the Point Reyes National Seashore on the coast of northern California in the United States, approximately  northwest of San Francisco at approximately 38 degrees north latitude. It is formed on the lee side of the coastal current by Point Reyes. The bay is named after Sir Francis Drake and has long been considered Drake's most likely landing spot on the west coast of North America during his circumnavigation of the world by sea in 1579. An alternative name for this bay is Puerto De Los Reyes.

The bay is fed by Drake's Estero, an expansive estuary on the Point Reyes peninsula. The estuary is protected by Estero de Limantour State Marine Reserve & Drakes Estero State Marine Conservation Area. Point Reyes State Marine Reserve & Point Reyes State Marine Conservation Area lie within Drakes Bay. Like underwater parks, these marine protected areas help conserve ocean wildlife and marine ecosystems.

A portion of the coastal area of Drakes Bay is archaeologically and historically important. It is believed to be the site of Francis Drake's 1579 landfall (which he called New Albion), and also the location where a Spanish Manila galleon sank during a storm in 1595. Both Drake and the Portuguese commander of the galleon, Sebastião Rodrigues Soromenho, interacted with the local Coast Miwok. There are fifteen archaeological sites on the bay of Miwok settlements where European trade goods have been found, including materials that the Miwok probably recovered from the wrecked galleon. The region was designated a National Historic Landmark District on October 17, 2012.

See also
New Albion
Tomales Bay
Drake's Plate of Brass
 Camp Hydle
List of National Historic Landmarks in California

References

External links
Again a safe harbor: Tiny cove many believe Sir Francis Drake repaired to 422 years ago suddenly reappears, San Francisco Chronicle, July 18, 2001
Shifting sandbars match Drake's descriptions of landing site
Francis Drake: The Naming of Drakes Bay

Bays of California
Bays of Marin County, California
Landforms of the San Francisco Bay Area
West Marin
National Historic Landmarks in the San Francisco Bay Area
Point Reyes National Seashore
National Register of Historic Places in Marin County, California